Phenylketonuria (PKU) is an inborn error of metabolism that results in decreased metabolism of the amino acid phenylalanine. Untreated PKU can lead to intellectual disability, seizures, behavioral problems, and mental disorders. It may also result in a musty smell and lighter skin. A baby born to a mother who has poorly treated PKU may have heart problems, a small head, and low birth weight.

Phenylketonuria is an inherited genetic disorder. It is caused by mutations in the PAH gene, which can result in inefficient or nonfunctional phenylalanine hydroxylase, an enzyme responsible for the metabolism of excess phenylalanine. This results in the buildup of dietary phenylalanine to potentially toxic levels. It is autosomal recessive, meaning that both copies of the gene must be mutated for the condition to develop. There are two main types, classic PKU and variant PKU, depending on whether any enzyme function remains. Those with one copy of a mutated gene typically do not have symptoms. Many countries have newborn screening programs for the disease.

Treatment is with a diet that (1) is low in foods that contain phenylalanine, and which (2) includes special supplements. Babies should use a special formula with a small amount of breast milk. The diet should begin as soon as possible after birth and be continued for life. People who are diagnosed early and maintain a strict diet can have normal health and a normal life span. Effectiveness is monitored through periodic blood tests. The medication sapropterin dihydrochloride may be useful in some.

Phenylketonuria affects about 1 in 12,000 babies. Males and females are affected equally. The disease was discovered in 1934 by Ivar Asbjørn Følling, with the importance of diet determined in 1935. Gene therapy, while promising, requires a great deal more study as of 2014.

Signs and symptoms

Untreated PKU can lead to intellectual disability, seizures, behavioral problems, and mental disorders. It may also result in a musty smell and lighter skin. A baby born to a mother who has poorly treated PKU may have heart problems, a small head, and low birth weight.

Because the mother's body is able to break down phenylalanine during pregnancy, infants with PKU are normal at birth. The disease is not detectable by physical examination at that time, because no damage has yet been done. Newborn screening is performed to detect the disease and initiate treatment before any damage is done. The blood sample is usually taken by a heel prick, typically performed 2–7 days after birth. This test can reveal elevated phenylalanine levels after one or two days of normal infant feeding.

If a child is not diagnosed during the routine newborn screening test and a phenylalanine-restricted diet is not introduced, then phenylalanine levels in the blood will increase over time. Toxic levels of phenylalanine (and insufficient levels of tyrosine) can interfere with infant development in ways that have permanent effects. The disease may present clinically with seizures,  hypopigmentation (excessively fair hair and skin), and a "musty odor" to the baby's sweat and urine (due to phenylacetate, a carboxylic acid produced by the oxidation of phenylacetone). In most cases, a repeat test should be done at approximately two weeks of age to verify the initial test and uncover any phenylketonuria that was initially missed.

Untreated children often fail to attain early developmental milestones, develop microcephaly, and demonstrate progressive impairment of cerebral function. Hyperactivity, EEG abnormalities, and seizures, and severe learning disabilities are major clinical problems later in life. A characteristic "musty or mousy" odor on the skin, as well as a predisposition for eczema, persist throughout life in the absence of treatment.

The damage done to the brain if PKU is untreated during the first months of life is not reversible. It is critical to control the diet of infants with PKU very carefully so that the brain has an opportunity to develop normally. Affected children who are detected at birth and treated are much less likely to develop neurological problems or have seizures and intellectual disability (though such clinical disorders are still possible including asthma, eczema, anemia, weight gain, renal insufficiency, osteoporosis, gastritis, esophagus, and kidney deficiencies, kidney stones, and hypertension). Additionally, major depressive disorders occur 230% higher than controls; dizziness and giddiness occur 180% higher; chronic ischemic heart disease, asthma, diabetes, and gastroenteritis occur 170% higher; and stress and adjustment disorders occur 160% higher. In general, however, outcomes for people treated for PKU are good. Treated people may have no detectable physical, neurological, or developmental problems at all.

Genetics

PKU is an autosomal recessive metabolic genetic disorder. As an autosomal recessive disorder, two PKU alleles are required for an individual to experience symptoms of the disease. For a child to inherit PKU, both the mother and father must have and pass on the defective gene. If both parents are carriers for PKU, there is a 25% chance any child they have will be born with the disorder, a 50% chance the child will be a carrier and a 25% chance the child will neither develop nor be a carrier for the disease.

PKU is characterized by homozygous or compound heterozygous mutations in the gene for the hepatic enzyme phenylalanine hydroxylase (PAH), rendering it nonfunctional. This enzyme is necessary to metabolize the amino acid phenylalanine (Phe) to the amino acid tyrosine (Tyr). When PAH activity is reduced, phenylalanine accumulates and is converted into phenylpyruvate (also known as phenylketone), which can be detected in the urine.

Carriers of a single PKU allele do not exhibit symptoms of the disease but  appear to be protected to some extent against the fungal toxin ochratoxin A. This accounts for the persistence of the allele in certain populations in that it confers a selective advantage—in other words, being a heterozygote is advantageous.

The PAH gene is located on chromosome 12 in the bands 12q22-q24.2. As of 2000, around 400 disease-causing mutations had been found in the PAH gene. This is an example of allelic genetic heterogeneity.

Pathophysiology
When phenylalanine (Phe) cannot be metabolized by the body, a typical diet that would be healthy for people without PKU causes abnormally high levels of Phe to accumulate in the blood, which is toxic to the brain. If left untreated (and often even in treatment), complications of PKU include severe intellectual disability, brain function abnormalities, microcephaly, mood disorders, irregular motor functioning, and behavioral problems such as attention deficit hyperactivity disorder, as well as physical symptoms such as a "musty" odor, eczema, and unusually light skin and hair coloration.

Classical PKU
Classical PKU, and its less severe forms "mild PKU" and "mild hyperphenylalaninemia" are caused by a mutated gene for the enzyme phenylalanine hydroxylase (PAH), which converts the amino acid phenylalanine ("Phe") to other essential compounds in the body, in particular tyrosine. Tyrosine is a conditionally essential amino acid for PKU patients because without PAH it cannot be produced in the body through the breakdown of phenylalanine. Tyrosine is necessary for the production of neurotransmitters like epinephrine, norepinephrine, and dopamine.

PAH deficiency causes a spectrum of disorders, including classic phenylketonuria (PKU) and mild hyperphenylalaninemia (also known as "hyperphe" or "mild HPA"), a less severe accumulation of phenylalanine. Compared to classic PKU patients, patients with "hyperphe" have greater PAH enzyme activity and are able to tolerate larger amounts of phenylalanine in their diets. Without dietary intervention, mild HPA patients have blood Phe levels higher than those with normal PAH activity. There is currently no international consensus on the definition of mild HPA, however, it is most frequently diagnosed at blood Phe levels between 2–6 mg/dL.

Phenylalanine is a large, neutral amino acid (LNAA). LNAAs compete for transport across the blood–brain barrier (BBB) via the large neutral amino acid transporter (LNAAT). If phenylalanine is in excess in the blood, it will saturate the transporter. Excessive levels of phenylalanine tend to decrease the levels of other LNAAs in the brain. As these amino acids are necessary for protein and neurotransmitter synthesis, Phe buildup hinders the development of the brain, causing intellectual disability.

Recent research suggests that neurocognitive, psychosocial, quality of life, growth, nutrition, bone pathology are slightly suboptimal even for patients who are treated and maintain their Phe levels in the target range, if their diet is not supplemented with other amino acids.

Classic PKU affects myelination and white matter tracts in untreated infants; this may be one major cause of neurological problems associated with phenylketonuria. Differences in white matter development are observable with magnetic resonance imaging. Abnormalities in gray matter can also be detected, particularly in the motor and pre-motor cortex, thalamus and the hippocampus.

It was recently suggested that PKU may resemble amyloid diseases, such as Alzheimer's disease and Parkinson's disease, due to the formation of toxic amyloid-like assemblies of phenylalanine.

Tetrahydrobiopterin-deficient hyperphenylalaninemia

A rarer form of hyperphenylalaninemia is tetrahydrobiopterin deficiency, which occurs when the PAH enzyme is normal, and a defect is found in the biosynthesis or recycling of the cofactor tetrahydrobiopterin (BH4). BH4 is necessary for proper activity of the enzyme PAH, and this coenzyme can be supplemented as treatment. Those with this form of hyperphenylalaninemia may have a deficiency of tyrosine (which is created from phenylalanine by PAH), in which case treatment is supplementation of tyrosine to account for this deficiency.

Levels of dopamine can be used to distinguish between these two types. Tetrahydrobiopterin is required to convert Phe to Tyr and is required to convert Tyr to L-DOPA via the enzyme tyrosine hydroxylase. L-DOPA, in turn, is converted to dopamine. Low levels of dopamine lead to high levels of prolactin. By contrast, in classical PKU (without dihydrobiopterin involvement), prolactin levels would be relatively normal.

As of 2020, tetrahydrobiopterin deficiency was known to result from defects in five genes.

Metabolic pathways

The enzyme phenylalanine hydroxylase normally converts the amino acid phenylalanine into the amino acid tyrosine. If this reaction does not take place, phenylalanine accumulates and tyrosine is deficient. Excessive phenylalanine can be metabolized into phenylketones through the minor route, a transaminase pathway with glutamate. Metabolites include phenylacetate, phenylpyruvate and phenethylamine. Elevated levels of phenylalanine in the blood and detection of phenylketones in the urine is diagnostic, however most patients are diagnosed via newborn screening.

Screening

PKU is commonly included in the newborn screening panel of many countries, with varied detection techniques. Most babies in developed countries are screened for PKU soon after birth.  Screening for PKU is done with bacterial inhibition assay (Guthrie test), immunoassays using fluorometric or photometric detection, or amino acid measurement using tandem mass spectrometry (MS/MS).  Measurements done using MS/MS determine the concentration of Phe and the ratio of Phe to tyrosine, the ratio will be elevated in PKU.

Treatment
PKU is not curable. However, if PKU is diagnosed early enough, an affected newborn can grow up with normal brain development by managing and controlling phenylalanine ("Phe") levels through diet, or a combination of diet and medication.

Diet
People who follow the prescribed dietary treatment from birth may (but not always) have no symptoms. Their PKU would be detectable only by a blood test. People must adhere to a special diet low in Phe for optimal brain development. Since Phe is necessary for the synthesis of many proteins, it is required for appropriate growth, but levels must be strictly controlled.

Optimal health ranges (or "target ranges") are between 120 and 360 μmol/L or equivalently 2 to 6 mg/dL. This is optimally to be achieved during at least the first 10 years, to allow the brain to develop normally.

The diet requires restricting or eliminating foods high in Phe, such as soybeans, egg whites, shrimp, chicken breast, spirulina, watercress, fish, nuts, crayfish, lobster, tuna, turkey, legumes, and lowfat cottage cheese. Starchy foods, such as potatoes and corn are generally acceptable in controlled amounts, but the quantity of Phe consumed from these foods must be monitored. A corn-free diet may be prescribed in some cases. A food diary is usually kept to record the amount of Phe consumed with each meal, snack, or drink. An "exchange" system can be used to calculate the amount of Phe in a portion of food from the protein content identified on a nutritional information label. Lower-protein "medical food" substitutes are often used in place of normal bread, pasta, and other grain-based foods, which contain a significant amount of Phe. Many fruits and vegetables are lower in Phe and can be eaten in larger quantities. Infants may still be breastfed to provide all of the benefits of breastmilk, but the quantity must also be monitored and supplementation for missing nutrients will be required.  The sweetener aspartame, present in many diet foods and soft drinks, must also be avoided, as aspartame contains phenylalanine.

Different people can tolerate different amounts of Phe in their diet. Regular blood tests are used to determine the effects of dietary Phe intake on blood Phe level.

Nutritional supplements
Supplementary "protein substitute" formulas are typically prescribed for people PKU (starting in infancy) to provide the amino acids and other necessary nutrients that would otherwise be lacking in a low-phenylalanine diet. Tyrosine, which is normally derived from phenylalanine and which is necessary for normal brain function, is usually supplemented. Consumption of the protein substitute formulas can actually reduce phenylalanine levels, probably because it stops the process of  protein catabolism from releasing Phe stored in the muscles and other tissues into the blood. Many PKU patients have their highest Phe levels after a period of fasting (such as overnight) because fasting triggers catabolism. A diet that is low in phenylalanine but does not include protein substitutes may also fail to lower blood Phe levels, since a nutritionally insufficient diet may also trigger catabolism. For all these reasons, the prescription formula is an important part of the treatment for patients with classic PKU.

Evidence supports dietary supplementation with large neutral amino acids (LNAAs). The LNAAs (e.g. leu, tyr, trp, met, his, ile, val, thr) may compete with phe for specific carrier proteins that transport LNAAs across the intestinal mucosa into the blood and across the blood–brain barrier into the brain. Its use is limited in the US due to the cost but is available in most countries as part of a low protein / PHE diet to replace missing nutrients.

Another interesting treatment strategy is casein glycomacropeptide (CGMP), which is a milk peptide naturally free of Phe in its pure form CGMP can substitute for the main part of the free amino acids in the PKU diet and provides several beneficial nutritional effects compared to free amino acids. The fact that CGMP is a peptide ensures that the absorption rate of its amino acids is prolonged compared to free amino acids and thereby results in improved protein retention and increased satiety compared to free amino acids. Another important benefit of CGMP is that the taste is significantly improved when CGMP substitutes part of the free amino acids and this may help ensure improved compliance to the PKU diet.

Furthermore, CGMP contains a high amount of the Phe-lowering LNAAs, which constitutes about 41 g per 100 g protein and will therefore help maintain plasma phe levels in the target range.

Enzyme substitutes
In 2018, the FDA approved an enzyme substitute called pegvaliase which metabolizes phenylalanine. It is for adults who are poorly managed on other treatments.

Tetrahydrobiopterin (BH4) (a cofactor for the oxidation of phenylalanine) when taken by mouth can reduce blood levels of this amino acid in some people.

Mothers
For women with PKU, it is important for the health of their children to maintain low Phe levels before and during pregnancy. Though the developing fetus may only be a carrier of the PKU gene, the intrauterine environment can have very high levels of phenylalanine, which can cross the placenta. The child may develop congenital heart disease, growth retardation, microcephaly and intellectual disability as a result. PKU-affected women themselves are not at risk of additional complications during pregnancy.

In most countries, women with PKU who wish to have children are advised to lower their blood Phe levels (typically to between 2 and 6 mg/dL) before they become pregnant, and carefully control their levels throughout the pregnancy. This is achieved by performing regular blood tests and adhering very strictly to a diet, in general monitored on a day-to-day basis by a specialist metabolic dietitian. In many cases, as the fetus' liver begins to develop and produce PAH normally, the mother's blood Phe levels will drop, requiring an increased intake to remain within the safe range of 2–6 mg/dL. The mother's daily Phe intake may double or even triple by the end of the pregnancy, as a result. When maternal blood Phe levels fall below 2 mg/dL, anecdotal reports indicate that the mothers may experience adverse effects, including headaches, nausea, hair loss, and general malaise. When low phenylalanine levels are maintained for the duration of pregnancy, there are no elevated levels of risk of birth defects compared with a baby born to a non-PKU mother.

Epidemiology

The average number of new cases of PKU varies in different human populations. United States Caucasians are affected at a rate of 1 in 10,000. Turkey has the highest documented rate in the world, with 1 in 2,600 births, while countries such as Finland and Japan have extremely low rates with fewer than one case of PKU in 100,000 births. A 1987 study from Slovakia reports a Roma population with an extremely high incidence of PKU (one case in 40 births) due to extensive inbreeding. It is the most common amino acid metabolic problem in the United Kingdom.

History

Before the causes of PKU were understood, PKU caused severe disability in most people who inherited the relevant mutations. Nobel and Pulitzer Prize winning author Pearl S. Buck had a daughter named Carol who lived with PKU before treatment was available, and wrote an account of its effects in a book called The Child Who Never Grew. Many untreated PKU patients born before widespread newborn screening are still alive, largely in dependent living homes/institutions.

Phenylketonuria was discovered by the Norwegian physician Ivar Asbjørn Følling in 1934 when he noticed hyperphenylalaninemia (HPA) was associated with intellectual disability. In Norway, this disorder is known as Følling's disease, named after its discoverer. Følling was one of the first physicians to apply detailed chemical analysis to the study of disease.

In 1934 at Rikshospitalet, Følling saw a young woman named Borgny Egeland. She had two children, Liv and Dag, who had been normal at birth but subsequently developed intellectual disability. When Dag was about a year old, the mother noticed a strong smell to his urine. Følling obtained urine samples from the children and, after many tests, he found that the substance causing the odor in the urine was phenylpyruvic acid. The children, he concluded, had excess phenylpyruvic acid in the urine, the condition which came to be called phenylketonuria (PKU).

His careful analysis of the urine of the two affected siblings led him to request many physicians near Oslo to test the urine of other affected patients. This led to the discovery of the same substance he had found in eight other patients. He conducted tests and found reactions that gave rise to benzaldehyde and benzoic acid, which led him to conclude that the compound contained a benzene ring. Further testing showed the melting point to be the same as phenylpyruvic acid, which indicated that the substance was in the urine.

In 1954, Horst Bickel, Evelyn Hickmans and John Gerrard published a paper that described how they created a diet that was low in phenylalanine and the patient recovered. Bickel, Gerrard and Hickmans were awarded the John Scott Medal in 1962 for their discovery.

PKU was the first disorder to be routinely diagnosed through widespread newborn screening. Robert Guthrie introduced the newborn screening test for PKU in the early 1960s.  With the knowledge that PKU could be detected before symptoms were evident, and treatment initiated, screening was quickly adopted around the world.  Ireland was the first country to introduce a national screening programme in February 1966, Austria also started screening in 1966 and England in 1968.

In 2017 the European Guidelines were published. They were called for by the patient organizations such as the European Society for Phenylketonuria and Allied Disorders Treated as Phenylketonuria. They have received some critical reception.

Etymology and pronunciation
The word phenylketonuria uses combining forms of phenyl + ketone + -uria; it is pronounced .

Research
Other therapies are currently under investigation, including gene therapy.

Biomarin is currently conducting clinical trials to investigate PEG-PAL (PEGylated recombinant phenylalanine ammonia lyase or 'PAL') is an enzyme substitution therapy in which the missing PAH enzyme is replaced with an analogous enzyme that also breaks down Phe. PEG-PAL is now in Phase 2 clinical development.

See also
 Hyperphenylalanemia
 Lofenalac
 Tetrahydrobiopterin deficiency
 Flowers for Algernon, which features a character who has phenylketonuria

References

External links 
 

Intellectual disability
Autosomal recessive disorders
Amino acid metabolism disorders
Skin conditions resulting from errors in metabolism
Disorders causing seizures
Biology of attention deficit hyperactivity disorder
Rare diseases
Wikipedia medicine articles ready to translate
Newborn screening